Sato's beaked whale (Berardius minimus) is a little-known species of four-toothed whale.

Description
Sato's beaked whale is one of the poorly distinguished species in the genus Berardius. It was distinguished from Arnoux's and Baird's beaked whale in 2019 on the basis of mtDNA differences. It generally has a short beak (~4% body length). While other four-toothed whales are generally grey with scars, kurotsuchis usually have few linear scars, so that the dark, smooth skin contrasts highly with round, white scars of about 5 cm diameter (from cookiecutter shark bites). The common name for Berardius minimus is in recognition of Hal Sato, a Hokkaido-based researcher whose photographs of the whales helped to distinguish this species from other beaked whales (note the image credit in Figure 1 and Figure 2 from the Yamada et. al. paper ).

Distribution
The species' distribution, based on genetic samples from strandings only, is believed to include the sea around Japan, the Russian Federation, and Alaska.

Conservation
Although very little is known about the ecology and populations of Sato's beaked whale, the IUCN has assigned the species a classification of Near threatened based on its estimated low population numbers.

References

Ziphiids
Mammals described in 2019